Walking on the Milky Way was released in April 1992 by Franciscus Henri, under ABC Music's ABC for Kids sub-label, as his sixth album. It received a nomination for Best Children's Album at the ARIA Music Awards of 1993. The music video for the title track, "Walking on the Milky Way", was compiled into ABC for Kids Video Hits Volume 2, a various artists' video released the same year.

Track listing
Hello (S Browne)
Walking on The Milky Way (F.Henri)
Oopy Goopy  (F.Henri)
I Can't Sit Still (F.Henri)
Little Lily Lilly Legs (F.Henri)
Water in My Shoes (F.Henri)
Here Comes That Day (F.Henri)
Ducks Like Rain (F.Henri)
Oh Sophia (F.Henri)
Monkey Band (I. Catchlove F.Henri)
Oogoo tree (F.Henri)
Friday Night (S Browne)
Oold Dark House (I. Catchlove, F.Henri)
Doctor, Doctor (F.Henri)
Happy, Sad Song  (F.Henri)
Little Red Car Song (I. Catchlove, F.Henri)
Give My Things Back  (F.Henri)
Don't You Wish You Were a Cowboy Too  (F.Henri)
Junk (S Browne)
Four Rubbish Bins  (F.Henri)
My Back Yard
River Boat
Pelican Pete  (F.Henri)
Going Fishing (AJ Leonard)
Jumping Jack
Teddy Bear
Wooden Heart

References

1992 albums
Franciscus Henri albums